Otto Strandman's cabinet was in office in Estonia from 9 May 1919 to 18 November 1919, when it was succeeded by Jaan Tõnisson's first cabinet.

Members

This cabinet's members were the following:

References

Cabinets of Estonia